Funakoshi (written: 船越, 舩越 or 舟越) is a Japanese surname. Notable people with the surname include:

, Japanese actor and television personality
, Japanese actor
, Okinawan master of karate
, son of Gichin Funakoshi
, Japanese sculptor
, better known as Rie fu, Japanese singer
, Japanese sculptor and painter
, Japanese footballer

See also
9842 Funakoshi, a main-belt asteroid
Funakoshi Station, a railway station in Oga, Akita Prefecture, Japan

Japanese-language surnames